Jacqueline Susann's Once Is Not Enough is a 1975 American romance film, directed by Guy Green, starring Kirk Douglas, Alexis Smith, David Janssen, George Hamilton, Brenda Vaccaro, Melina Mercouri, and Deborah Raffin. It was produced by Howard W. Koch and written by Julius J. Epstein, based on the 1973 novel Once Is Not Enough by Jacqueline Susann.

It featured Alexis Smith's return to the big screen after an absence of 16 years, and Brenda Vaccaro was nominated for the Academy Award for Best Supporting Actress and won the Golden Globe award for her role as Linda Riggs.

Plot
Mike Wayne is a middle-aged motion-picture producer whose career has fallen on hard times. Try as he may, Mike can no longer get a new Hollywood project made.

Accustomed to a lavish lifestyle, Mike has pampered his daughter, January, providing her with an expensive education in Europe and everything else money can buy. January worships her father and eagerly returns to America to be with him again.

Needing capital, Mike enters into a loveless marriage with Deidre Milford Granger, one of the world's wealthiest women. She has already been through multiple marriages and demands that things be done her way. She is also secretly carrying on a lesbian affair. January is devastated to learn that her father is now wed to this rude, arrogant woman.

Deidre attempts to draw January into a relationship with her cousin David Milford, a ladies' man who also usually gets his own way. He finally persuades January into going to bed with him, only to discover that she is a virgin.

Unsure what to do with her life, January is advised by an old friend, Linda Riggs, now a magazine editor, to write a book. Linda enjoys a free-spirited life with many lovers and urges January to do likewise. But due in no small part to her father complex, January instead falls for much older Tom Colt, a hard-drinking, impotent novelist who is an adversary of her father's.

Mike bitterly resents the affair. He punches Colt upon finding him with January in a Beverly Hills hotel cabin. Mike orders his daughter to make a choice between them and Colt gives her the same ultimatum. She chooses her lover.

Deidre's demands and insults finally become too much for Mike, who wants a divorce. They amicably agree to one but their airplane crashes and both are killed. The devastated January turns to Tom Colt for comfort but he turns against her, leaving her to go on alone.

January learns that she has inherited $3 million from her father's insurance policy to begin a new life for herself. When she goes to tell the good news to Linda, she finds her angry and distraught, having just been fired for having sex with her boss. Realizing that nothing is perfect in life, not even in its own way, January is left alone wandering Manhattan after dark but with hope that tomorrow will be a better day.

Cast

Despite only 14 seconds of screen time, with just two lines ("You dumb drunken broad! You could’ve been killed!"), actor Phil Foster is included in the film's opening credits.

Production
Guy Green was hired to direct the film, according to one Paramount executive, because he "might give it class". Green wanted Dick Van Dyke to play the role of Mike Wayne. He also wanted to fire David Janssen during rehearsals and replace him with Robert Shaw. Irving Mansfield said Kirk Douglas and Janssen directed themselves during the film.

The ending was made more hopeful than in the source novel. The novel ends with January trying acid and partaking in an orgy. She then wanders onto the beach where she hallucinates that she sees her father and walks into the ocean after him, presumably drowning.

See also
 List of American films of 1975

References

External links
 

1975 films
1975 drama films
American drama films
American LGBT-related films
1970s English-language films
Films scored by Henry Mancini
Films based on American novels
Films directed by Guy Green
1975 LGBT-related films
Paramount Pictures films
Films produced by Howard W. Koch
Films featuring a Best Supporting Actress Golden Globe-winning performance
1970s American films
LGBT-related drama films